António Brinco (born 30 May 1968) is a Portuguese sprint canoeist who competed in the late 1980s and the early 1990s. At the 1988 Summer Olympics in Seoul, he was eliminated in the repechages of the K-2 1000 m event. Four years later in Barcelona, Brinco was eliminated in the semifinals of the K-4 1000 m event.

References
Sports-Reference.com profile

1968 births
Canoeists at the 1988 Summer Olympics
Canoeists at the 1992 Summer Olympics
Living people
Olympic canoeists of Portugal
Portuguese male canoeists